Lysice is a market town in Blansko District in the South Moravian Region of the Czech Republic. It has about 1,900 inhabitants.

Notable people
Alois Muna (1886–1943), politician

References

Populated places in Blansko District
Market towns in the Czech Republic